is an American-born Japanese former actor.

Biography
Tani was born to an American father and a Japanese mother. His family moved to Ibaraki Prefecture when Tani was two years-old. As a child actor, he was part of the 26-member Precoci, a performing group. In 2003, Tani won the grand prize at the 16th Annual Junon Super Boy Contest and changed his stage name to Tani Kazunori. His currently lives in America, and it's unclear whether he's still working as an actor.

Films
 Hideshi Hino's Occult Detective Club: The Doll Cemetery (2004), as Makihara Daisuke (牧原 大介)
 Schoolboy Crush (2007), as Hanazono Riku (花園 陸)
 Koisuru Ketsuekigata (恋する血液型)

Television dramas
Ginza Kōkyū Kurabu Mama Aoyama Miyuki 3 (銀座高級クラブママ青山みゆき3)

Commercials
Kit Kat (2002)
Coca-Cola (2004)

Theatre
Dear Boys, the Musical (2007), as Moriyama Atsushi (森山 敦司)
Swing
Itazura na Kiss: Koi no Mikata no Gakuen Densetsu (2008, イタズラなKiss〜恋の味方の学園伝説), at the Theatre Sun-Mall in Tokyo
Hiiro no Kakera, the Musical (2008–2009, 緋色の欠片), as Kutani Ryō (狗谷 遼)

Awards
2003 Junon Super Boy Contest - Grand Prize

References

1985 births
Japanese male actors
Living people